The office of High Sheriff of Mid Glamorgan was established in 1974 as part of the creation of the county of Mid Glamorgan in Wales following the Local Government Act 1972, and, together with the High Sheriff of West Glamorgan and the High Sheriff of South Glamorgan, effectively replaced the office of the High Sheriff of Glamorgan.

High Sheriffs of Mid Glamorgan

Before 1974 – See High Sheriff of Glamorgan
1974: John Lewis Maybery Bevan of Croffta, Groes-Faen, Pontyclun, Llantrisant
1975: (Herbert) Leslie Joseph of Coedargraig, Newton, Porthcawl
1976: Douglas George Badham, C.B.E. of Plas Watford, Caerphilly
1977: Douglas Andrew Scott, O.B.E. of Porthcawl
1978: Murray Adams McLaggan of Merthyr Mawr House, Bridgend
1979: Major George Morgan Thomas Lindsay of Glanmor, Southerndown, Bridgend
1980: Robert Watkin Stacey Knight of Tynycaeau, St. Brides Major, near Bridgend
1981: Edward Arthur Lewis of Grove House, 38 Lan Park Road, Pontypridd
1982: William Kingdon Eynon of Tusker House, Newton, Porthcawl
1983: Alan Edward Mayer of Ty Mawr, Efail Isaf, Pontypridd
1984: Edward Rea of Llechwedd, Y Pare, Groesfaen, Pontyclun
1985: Owain Anthony Mervyn Williams of Llanharan House, Llanharan
1986: Mrs Kathrin (Kate) Thomas of Gelli Hir, Nelson, Treharris
1987: Peter Dobson Allen of Furzebrook, 82 Merthyr Mawr Road, Bridgend
1988: Derek William Charles Morgan of Erw Graig, Merthyr Mawr, Bridgend
1989: Harold John Tamplin, O.B.E. of Cwmnofydd Farm, Machen, Newport
1990: Islwyn Thomas Rees of Tan-y-lan Farm, St. Mary Hill, Pencoed
1991: David Edward Cox, L.V.O., M.B.E. of Trem-y-mor, 221 West Road, Nottage, Porthcawl
1992: Kenneth Merlin David Johns, O.B.E. of Pencoed House, Capel Llanilltern
1993: Barbara Magdalene Ladbrooke DL of Long Acre Farm, Coity 
1994: Colonel Thomas Udy Buckthought, T.D. of The Bucks, 13 Underwood, Caerphilly
1995: Byron Frederick Butler JP. of Aberkenfig
1996: Dan Clayton Jones, T.D., of Mwyndy House, Mwyndy, near Llantrisant
1997: Raymond William Martin of Ffynon Pantrhosla, Llangewydd, near Bridgend
1998: Anthony Robert Lewis
1999: David Hugh Thomas, Esq, C B E, Llys Gwyn, Bridgend
2000: William Hopkin Joseph, Fairfield Court, Laleston, Bridgend
2001: Michael Eammon McGrane, Nant, Coslech, Peterston Road, Groes Faen
2002: Gerald Haydn Coleman, Stray Leaves, Heol Spencer, Coity, Bridgend.
2003: John Henry Kendall Esq, Dan y Bryn, Vaynor, Merthyr Tydfil
2004: Mrs Bethan Mary Williams, Llanharan House, Llanharan.
2005: Clive Thomas
2006: Alan Sheppard
2007: Charles Knight
2008: Mrs Anne Y Morgan JP DL of Bridgend
2009: J Anthony Tal-Williams, MBE JP of Mountain Ash
2010: Miss Beverley A Humphreys of Pontypridd
2011: Dr Barbara Wilding CBE QPM CCMI
2012: Mrs Ann Jenkins
2013: Rory J M McLaggan
2014: Mrs Elizabeth Singer of Newton, Porthcawl
2015: Mrs Jayne Ann James of Longlands Farm, Pyle, Bridgend
2016: Gwynfryn John George of Caerphilly, Mid Glamorgan
2017: David John Davies of Porthcawl
2018: Jonathan Hugh Wall of Porthcawl
2019: Colonel Wilma Christina Jean Donnelly (Rtd) CBE TD, of Church Village
2020: Jason Michael Edwards of Pontypridd
2021: Jeffrey Edwards MBE, OStJ, JP, DL of Aberfan, Merthyr Tydfil.
2022: Mrs Maria Kovacevic Thomas BEM
2023: Professor Jean White, CBE

References

 
Mid Glamorgan
Mid Glamorgan